Sankie Mthembi-Mahanyele (born 23 March 1951), formerly known as Sankie Mthembi-Nkondo or Sankie Nkondo, is a South African politician and diplomat who was the Minister of Housing from 1995 to 2003. She also served as Deputy Secretary-General of the African National Congress (ANC) from 2002 to 2007.

Biography 
Mthembi-Mahanyele was born Sankie Dolly Mthembi on 23 March 1951. During apartheid, she lived in exile with the African National Congress (ANC), which was then based in Lusaka, Zambia. She was a journalist on Radio Freedom and worked under Thabo Mbeki in the ANC's department of international affairs. During this period (and thereafter), she wrote literature under the pseudonym Rebecca Matlou.

After the end of apartheid in 1994, she was appointed Deputy Minister of Welfare in the South African government, under President Nelson Mandela. She stood for election as the ANC's Deputy Secretary-General at the ANC's 49th National Conference in December 1994, but – although she was believed to have the support of Mandela, Mbeki, and Jacob Zuma – lost "decisively" to the more left-wing candidate, Cheryl Carolus.

Following the death of Joe Slovo, she was Minister of Housing from early 1995 to early 2003, serving under both Mandela and his successor, Mbeki. In 1999, she sued the Mail & Guardian for defamation, in connection to the newspaper's claim in December 1998 that Mthembi-Mahanyele had awarded a housing contract to a friend; the Supreme Court of Appeal ultimately agreed with the Johannesburg High Court that the report did not amount to defamation. In 2003, she won an award from United Nations Habitat for her work in the housing portfolio.

Her resignation from the cabinet coincided with her election as Deputy Secretary-General of the ANC at the party's 51st National Conference in December 2002. She served in that position until the 52nd National Conference in December 2007, when she did not stand for re-election. In later years, she served as chairman of South Africa's Central Energy Fund from February 2012 until her resignation in 2015. She was South Africa's Ambassador to Switzerland from 2018 until 2022, when she was appointed Ambassador to Spain.

Personal life 
While in exile, Mthembi-Mahanyele was married to Zinjiva Winston Nkondo, and was known as Sankie Mthembi-Nkondo. Nkondo was also an ANC activist and writer (under the pseudonym Victor Matlou); they divorced. In 1996, Mthembi-Mahanyele married Mohale Mahanyele (b. 1939, d. 2012), a businessman. They had one daughter, Nare, together.

References 

South African politicians
African National Congress politicians
Living people
1951 births